The Liouville Lambda function, denoted by λ(n) and named after Joseph Liouville, is an important arithmetic function. 
Its value is +1 if n is the product of an even number of prime numbers, and −1 if it is the product of an odd number of primes. 

Explicitly, the fundamental theorem of arithmetic states that any positive integer n can be represented uniquely as a product of powers of primes:      where  p1 < p2 < ... < pk are primes and the aj are positive integers. (1 is given by the empty product.) The prime omega functions  count the number of primes,  with (Ω) or without (ω) multiplicity:

ω(n) = k,  
Ω(n) = a1 + a2 + ... + ak. 

λ(n) is defined by the formula

   .

λ is completely multiplicative since Ω(n) is completely additive, i.e.: Ω(ab) = Ω(a) + Ω(b). Since 1 has no prime factors, Ω(1) = 0 so λ(1) = 1. 

It is related to the Möbius function  μ(n). Write n as n = a2b where b is squarefree,   i.e.,  ω(b) = Ω(b).  Then 

The sum of the Liouville function over the divisors of n is the characteristic function of the squares:

Möbius inversion of this formula yields

The Dirichlet inverse of Liouville function is the absolute value of the Möbius function,  the characteristic function of the squarefree integers. We also have that .

Series
The Dirichlet series for the Liouville function is related to the Riemann zeta function by

Also:

The Lambert series for the Liouville function is

where  is the Jacobi theta function.

Conjectures on weighted summatory functions

The Pólya conjecture is a conjecture made by George Pólya in 1919. Defining

  ,

the conjecture states that  for n > 1. This turned out to be false.  The smallest counter-example is n = 906150257, found by Minoru Tanaka in 1980. It has since been shown that L(n) > 0.0618672 for infinitely many positive integers n, while it can also be shown via the same methods that L(n) < -1.3892783 for infinitely many positive integers n.

For any , assuming the Riemann hypothesis, we have that the summatory function  is bounded by 

 

Define the related sum

 

It was open for some time whether T(n) ≥ 0 for sufficiently big n ≥ n0 (this conjecture is occasionally–though incorrectly–attributed to Pál Turán). A confirmation of this positivity conjecture would have led to a proof of the Riemann hypothesis, as was shown by Pál Turán.

Generalizations

More generally, we can consider the weighted summatory functions over the Liouville function defined for any  as follows for positive integers x where (as above) we have the special cases  and  

 

These -weighted summatory functions are related to the Mertens function, or weighted summatory functions of the Moebius function. In fact, we have that the so-termed non-weighted, or ordinary function  precisely corresponds to the sum 

 

Moreover, these functions satisfy similar bounding asymptotic relations. For example, whenever , we see that there exists an absolute constant  such that 

By an application of Perron's formula, or equivalently by a key (inverse) Mellin transform, we have that 

 

In particular, if we assume that the 

 

where for any increasingly small  we define 

 

and where the remainder term 

 

These exact analytic formula expansions again share similar properties to those corresponding to the weighted Mertens function cases.

References

 
 
 
 
 
 

Multiplicative functions